Volontaires is a station on Line 12 of the Paris Métro. Located in the 15th arrondissement, at the junction of the Rue des Volontaires (which it is named after) with the Rue de Vaugirard, it opened on 5 November 1910 as part of the original section of Line A of the Nord-Sud Company between Porte de Versailles and Notre-Dame-de-Lorette. On 27 March 1931, Line A became Line 12 of the Métro network.

Station layout

References
Roland, Gérard (2003). Stations de métro. D’Abbesses à Wagram. Éditions Bonneton.

Paris Métro stations in the 15th arrondissement of Paris
Railway stations in France opened in 1910